Haemanthus avasmontanus Dinter is a South African bulbous geophyte in the genus Haemanthus. It is known from the type specimens only, which were collected by Kurt Dinter on 12 February 1923 from a single locality in the Auasberge near Tigerfontein on steep, south-facing, mica schist ledges, south-east of Windhoek in central Namibia. (Snijman, 1984). Despite thorough searches by a number of field botanists, no plants have been found since.

This species produces two erect, strap-shaped leaves annually, 350–400 x 40–45 mm, smooth and soft-textured. The flowerstalk is 250–350 mm long, with a brush-like flowerhead 45 mm in diameter; the acutely tipped spathe segments or valves are about as long as the flowers. Flowers 15–20, pure white; pedicels 7–10 mm long (Snijman, 1984).

References

The Genus Haemanthus: A Revision - Deidré Snijman (National Botanic Gardens of South Africa 1984) 

avasmontanus
Flora of Namibia
Plants described in 1923
Taxa named by Kurt Dinter